British folklore constitutes the folklore of Britain, and includes topics such as the region's legends, recipes, and folk beliefs. British folklore includes English folklore, Irish folklore, Scottish folklore and Welsh folklore.

Big cats 
Big cats are said to roam the British countrysides and moorlands like the puma, lynx and black panther who escaped from zoos and there have been reportable sights of the beasts, in the 20th centuries. This includes the Beast of Exmoor and Bodmin Moor.

See also 
Celtic mythology
Cornish mythology
Hebridean mythology and folklore
Irish mythology
Matter of Britain
Matter of England
Scottish mythology
Welsh mythology

Notes

References
Chainey, Dee Dee. 2018. A Treasury of British Folklore: Maypoles, Mandrakes, & Mistletoe. National Trust.

External links